Persons with the surname Peele include:
 Amanda E. Peele (1903–1978), American biologist
Beverly Peele (b. 1975), fashion model
 George Peele (1556-1596), the English dramatist
 John Thomas Peele (1822-1897), British painter
 Jordan Peele (b. 1979), filmmaker, comedian, and actor
 Randy Peele (b. 1957), basketball coach
 Stanton Peele (b. 1946), author of books about addiction
 William Walter Peele (1881-1959), American Methodist Bishop

See also
 Pele (name), given name and surname
 Peel (disambiguation)
 Peale (disambiguation)